TNN Outdoors Bass Tournament '96 is a sequel to the fishing video game TNN Bass Tournament of Champions. It was released exclusively in North America in 1996.

Summary

While the graphics were slightly enhanced, the goal of the game is primarily the same. Rural and suburban teenage boys were primarily the target audience of this electronic video game. Famous settings used in this game include Lake Erie, Lake Huron, and Lake Superior. Other things added to this game are temperature, time, wind speed, and weather.

All the fishing that is done on Lake Erie is done entirely on the western part of the lake in the Michigan/Ohio area. Everything can affect the player's performance; including the weather, the season, the time of day and even the strength of the wind. All games start at 7:30 AM local time and end at sunset when all boats must dock in for the weigh-in ceremonies.

References

1996 video games
Fishing video games
Imagitec Design games
North America-exclusive video games
Sega Genesis games
Sega Genesis-only games
Sports video games set in the United States
Video game sequels
Video games developed in the United Kingdom
Video games set in 1996
ASC Games games
Multiplayer and single-player video games